Francis Monckton (7 March 1844 – 30 September 1926) was an English Conservative politician who sat in the House of Commons from 1871 to 1885.

Monckton was the eldest son of Gen. Henry Monckton of Stretton Hall, Staffordshire and his wife Ann Smythe. He was educated at Eton  and Christ Church, Oxford.

At a by-election in 1871 he was returned unopposed as Member of Parliament (MP) for West Staffordshire on the death of the previous incumbent, holding the seat until 1885. He inherited the estates of Stretton and Somerford Hall from his uncle, George Monckton. He was High Sheriff of Staffordshire for 1895–96.

Monckton married Evelyn Mary Heber-Percy, daughter of Algernon Charles Heber-Percy and Emily Heber, on 16 July 1889.

References

External links 
 

1844 births
1929 deaths
People from South Staffordshire District
People educated at Eton College
Alumni of Christ Church, Oxford
Conservative Party (UK) MPs for English constituencies
UK MPs 1868–1874
UK MPs 1874–1880
UK MPs 1880–1885
High Sheriffs of Staffordshire